Judah Kelly is an Australian singer-songwriter best known for winning the sixth series of The Voice Australia in 2017. He signed with Universal Music Australia. Kelly described his music as "country with soul".

Early life
In 2006, Kelly attended Queens Beach State School in Bowen Queensland. While there, he was a part of the school choir. 

In 2011, Kelly attended the Junior Academy of Country Music in Tamworth, New South Wales, and has since also made regular appearances at the Tamworth Country Music Festival.

Kelly auditioned for The X Factor Australia in 2012 and 2014, without success.

Career

2017: The Voice

In 2017, Kelly took part in the sixth season of The Voice Australia, where he joined Delta Goodrem's team after singing "Tennessee Whiskey" in the blind audition. He made it through to the Grand Finale, held on 2 July, where he was announced as the winner.
His winner's single "Count On Me" was released immediately after the announcement. Speaking to Fairfax Media, Kelly said: "I came in not really seeing myself getting very far at all in the competition, to be able to say that I won... it's everything." Kelly stated that "Count On Me" is about battling "dark times". The song debuted at number 19 on the ARIA Charts with 7,980 sales.

 denotes winner.
 denotes a song that reached the top 10 on iTunes.

On December 15, Kelly released a live version of Leonard Cohen's "Hallelujah".

2018: Real Good Time

On 10 August 2018, Kelly released "Real Good Time" the lead single from his second studio album of the same name due on 5 October 2018. Kelly also announced a "Real Good Time" tour commencing in October 2018.

On 5 October 2018, Kelly released "Found" as the second single from Real Good Time.

Discography

Albums

Singles

Awards and nominations

Country Music Awards of Australia
The Country Music Awards of Australia is an annual awards night held in January during the Tamworth Country Music Festival. Celebrating recording excellence in the Australian country music industry. They commenced in 1973.
 

! 
|-
| 2018
| Judah Kelly
| New Artist of the Year
| 
|
|-
| 2019
| Judah Kelly
| New Artist of the Year
| 
|
|}

References

External links
 
 

Living people
Kelly, Judah
People from Queensland
The Voice (Australian TV series) contestants
The Voice (franchise) winners
1996 births
21st-century Australian singers